D. Bruce Winter (born 18 April 1953) is a former Australian rules footballer who played for the Norwood Football Club and the Sturt Football Club in the South Australian National Football League (SANFL). He also coached .

Outside of football, Winter worked as a microbiologist at the Institute of Medical and Veterinary Science.

References

External links

Norwood Football Club players
Sturt Football Club players
Woodville-West Torrens Football Club coaches
South Australian Football Hall of Fame inductees
1953 births
Living people